Abat Kayratuly Aymbetov (born 7 August 1995) is a Kazakhstani football player who plays for Astana and the Kazakhstan national team.

Career

Club
Aymbetov made his Kazakhstan Premier League debut for FC Aktobe on 26 September 2012 in a game against FC Akzhayik.
On 27 January 2020, FC Kairat announced the signing of Aymbetov to a one-year contract, with the option of a second.
On 21 February 2021, Krylia Sovetov announced the signing of Aymbetov. On 21 January 2022, his contract with Krylia Sovetov was terminated by mutual consent.

Astana
On 2 April 2021, Astana announced the signing of Aymbetov on loan from Krylia Sovetov until the summer transfer window. On 13 July 2021, the loan to Astana was extended until the end of 2021. In January 2022, Aymbetov returned to Astana for their first pre-season training camp in Turkey.

International
Aymbetov made his Kazakhstan national football team debut on 8 June 2019 in a Euro 2020 qualifier against Belgium, as a 66th-minute substitute for Maxim Fedin.

Career statistics

Club

International

International goals 
Scores and results list Kazakhstan's goal tally first.

References

External links
 

1995 births
People from Kyzylorda
Living people
Kazakhstani footballers
Kazakhstan under-21 international footballers
Kazakhstan international footballers
Association football forwards
FC Aktobe players
FC Kairat players
PFC Krylia Sovetov Samara players
FC Astana players
Kazakhstan Premier League players
Kazakhstani expatriate footballers
Expatriate footballers in Russia